The Sea Sprite 27, also called the Sea Sprite 28 and the Luders 28, is an American sailboat that was designed by Bill Luders as a cruiser and first built in 1960.

The Sea Sprite 27 design is one of the Sea Sprite Sailing Yachts series of boats.

Production
The design was built by C. E. Ryder in Bristol, Rhode Island, United States between 1960 and 1985, but it is now out of production.

Design
The Sea Sprite 27 is a recreational keelboat, built predominantly of fiberglass, with teak wooden trim. It has a 7/8 fractional sloop rig, a spooned raked stem, a raised transom, a keel-mounted rudder controlled by a tiller and a fixed long keel. It displaces  and carries  of ballast.

The boat's galley is located on the port side of the cabin just forward of the companionway steps, with the icebox doubling as a navigation table. The galley has a two-burner alcohol stove and a sink with pressurized water. The head occupies both side of the hull, just aft of the bow "V"-berth. Additional sleeping space is provided in the cabin with a double berth and a quarter berth.

Ventilation is provided by a translucent forward hatch and four opening ports in the cabin. A second mid-ship hatch was a factory option.

The cockpit has two genoa winches and a third winch for the halyards. There is a standard topping lift and jiffy-reefing. The mainsheet traveler is mounted just behind the cockpit.

Factory options included a boom vang, spinnaker and gear, roller furling and wheel steering in place of the tiller.

See also
List of sailing boat types

Related development
Sea Sprite 34

Similar sailboats
Alerion Express 28
Aloha 28
Beneteau First 285
Cal 28
Catalina 28
Cumulus 28
Grampian 28
Hunter 28
Hunter 28.5
Hunter 280
J/28
O'Day 28
Pearson 28
Sabre 28
Sirius 28
Tanzer 28
TES 28 Magnam
Viking 28

References

Keelboats
1960s sailboat type designs
Sailing yachts
Sailboat type designs by Bill Luders
Sailboat types built by C. E. Ryder